Kenneth David Smith (born 9 July 1956) is an English cricket administrator and former first-class cricketer.

David Smith was born in Newcastle upon Tyne, Northumberland. He represented Warwickshire County Cricket Club as a right-handed batsman in 197 first-class matches (1973–1985) passing 1,000 runs four times and 108 ListA matches (1975–1984). He frequently opened the innings with Dennis Amiss during his career. His best season was in 1980, when he scored 1,582 runs at an average of 36.79 with two hundreds and 12 fifties. As his first-class career declined, he became successful in the limited-over format. He played in one Youth Test in 1974 versus the West Indies scoring 41.

Upon retiring, he led a successful business career and served on the Warwickshire Committee for nine years. He later spent two years with Leicestershire as chief executive (2008–2010) and three years in a similar role with Northamptonshire (2011–2014).

Family
His father Kenneth played regularly for Leicestershire in 1950–1951, his former father-in-law Alan Oakman represented Sussex  (1947–1968) and England in 1956, while his younger brother Paul also played for Warwickshire (1982–1996)

External links
 Cricinfo profile
 David Smith takes charge at Grace Road
 Leicestershire chief executive David Smith resigns
 Northants appoint David Smith as chief executive

1956 births
Living people
English cricket administrators
English cricketers
Warwickshire cricketers
Cricketers from Newcastle upon Tyne
Marylebone Cricket Club cricketers
Young England cricketers